The following is a list of couples who were awarded and nominated for the Nobel Prize. The latest couple to receive the Prize were Abhijit Banerjee and Esther Duflo for Economics.

Laureates

Nominees

Notes

References

External links 

venerated
Nobel Prize